The Delano Record was a semi-weekly newspaper serving Delano, California and surrounding area. It ceased publication in 2017 as an individual publication, but appears to have reemerged as a subsection of the Bakersfield.com website.

History 
The Delano Record began as the Delano Holograph in 1908. George Keyzers bought the newspaper in 1950, and operated it until its sale to Reed Print Co. in 1985.

During the late 1960s it was known for supporting grape growers over workers during the Delano grape strike. Cesar Chavez recalled that the Record accused him of using "vicious dogs" to scare workers into signing up for the newly formed union. In fact, the FBI file compiled on Chavez when he was considered for an appointment in the Johnson administration contained an editorial from the Record arguing that such an appointment would be a "cruel hoax": We agree with David Fairbairn . . . that this proposed appointment is an absurdity, but we go further. We submit this is a cynical and cruel hoax that in the long run can only undermine and make a mockery of the legitimate aspirations of our citizens of Mexican ancestry for the recognition by officialdom to which they are entitled...

In 2011, Schafter Press, which printed the Record, caught fire. The fire destroyed the paper news archives, causing the loss of any material that had not previously been stored on microfiche.

The newspaper closed its doors in 2017 after Reed Print folded. The Bakersfield.com site (formerly The Bakersfield Californian) was  publishing a weekly section identified as the Delano Record, but the connection to the previous publication is unclear. The site features the reporting of local journalists Gene Garaygordobil and Maria Ahumada-Garaygordobil (of the local news site and former Record competitor DelanoNow) and the columns of Gary Girard and publishes under the name The Record.

References 

Defunct newspapers published in California
Mass media in Kern County, California
Publications established in 1908